Judson Rochelle Flint (born January 26, 1957) is a former American football defensive back who played four seasons in the National Football League with the Cleveland Browns and Buffalo Bills. He was drafted by the New England Patriots in the seventh round of the 1979 NFL Draft. He first enrolled at California University of Pennsylvania before transferring to Memphis State University. Flint attended Farrell High School in Farrell, Pennsylvania.

Professional career
Flint was selected by the New England Patriots with the 177th pick in the 1979 NFL Draft. He missed the 1979 season due to a knee injury. He was released by the Patriots on September 1, 1980.

Cleveland Browns
Flint signed with the Cleveland Browns on September 27, 1980. He played in 38 games for the team from 1980 to 1982. In July 1983, he was named out of action indefinitely with a broken right ankle. He was later released by the Browns.

Buffalo Bills
Flint was signed by the Buffalo Bills on December 13, 1983, and played in one game for the Bills during the 1983 season. He was released by the Bills on July 30, 1984.

References

External links
Just Sports Stats
College stats

Living people
1957 births
American football defensive backs
African-American players of American football
California Vulcans football players
Memphis Tigers football players
Cleveland Browns players
Buffalo Bills players
Players of American football from Pennsylvania
People from Farrell, Pennsylvania
21st-century African-American people
20th-century African-American sportspeople